Elisabeth Mooij, also known as Elisabeth Ghijben (Amsterdam, 1712 – Amsterdam, 1759), was a Dutch actress. She was among the biggest stars in the Netherlands in her time.   

Elisabeth Mooij was the daughter of the wine maker Willem Mooij and Sara Ledeboer. In 1731, she married the oyster dealer Robbert Ghijben. She was employed at the Schouwburg theatre in 1743–1759. After the death of Anna Maria de Bruyn in 1744, she was made first actress, and after this, she was often given the leading roles in the theatre's productions.

See also 
Johanna Wattier

References 
 http://www.inghist.nl/Onderzoek/Projecten/DVN/voltooide_lemmata

1712 births
1759 deaths
Actresses from Amsterdam
18th-century Dutch actresses